June Rae Wood is an American author. One of her books, The Man Who Loved Clowns, won the Mark Twain Award and William Allen White Award in 1995.

Early life 

June Rae Wood grew up in Versailles, Missouri, with seven siblings. Her brother, Richard, who had Down syndrome, was her inspiration for The Man Who Loved Clowns. June's other brothers and sisters had to protect Richard from other people who would be mean to him. Many people would laugh and stare, but Richard thought this was a compliment.

References 
*
June Rae Wood 1: http://mowrites4kids.drury.edu/authors/wood/
Penguin biography

External links

 

1946 births
Living people
American children's writers
American women novelists
People from Versailles, Missouri
American women children's writers
21st-century American women